The Rüzgar class is one of the Fast Attack Craft / Missile Boat classes of the Turkish Navy.

Designed by Lürssen Werft in Germany, these ships are almost identical to the Yıldız and Doğan classes, having the same hull, machinery and weapons; but are lighter and faster. All four ships of the class were built in Turkey.

List of boats

See also
 Fast Attack Craft
 Missile Boat
List of Turkish Navy ships

External links
 Official Turkish Navy site
 Turkish Navy patrol craft
Wordpress Site Hızlandır

Missile boat classes
Missile boats of the Turkish Navy